Lesya Zaburanna (born 22 August 1981) is a Member of the Parliament of Ukraine. She is the Chair of the Subcommittee on Public Expenditures.

Life 
Zaburanna was born in Kyiv in 1981. She graduated from the Kyiv National University of Trade and Economics (majoring in "Enterprise Economics").

After graduating Zaburanna took internships in Europe and in North America. She has researched the socio-economic development of depressed areas and gender equality in Ukrainian society. She is a member of the Association for the Promotion of Rural Green Tourism Development in Ukraine and an Expert of the Scientific Expert Council of the Ministry of Agrarian Policy and Food of Ukraine  .

She was the Y. S. Zavadsky professor of the department of management at the National University of Bioresources and Nature Management of Ukraine when she was a candidate for People's Deputies from the Servant of the People party in the parliamentary elections in 2019 ( election district No. 216, part of the Dniprovsky district of Kyiv ). She is the Chair of the Subcommittee on Public Expenditures.
  
She sits on the Verkhovna Rada Committee on Budget and she chairs the Subcommittee on State Budget Expenditures. She is a Member of the Permanent Delegation to the Parliamentary Assembly of the Council of Europe and co-chair of the group on inter-parliamentary relations with Canada .

In December 2002 she was at a meeting in America where the possibility of prosecuting a "Crime of Aggression" under international law. This followed the creation of a list of "atrocity crimes" following Russia's invasion of Ukraine in February 2022.

References 

1981 births
Living people
Politicians from Kyiv
Kyiv National University of Trade and Economics alumni
Ukrainian women economists
21st-century Ukrainian economists
Women members of the Verkhovna Rada
Ninth convocation members of the Verkhovna Rada
21st-century Ukrainian women politicians
Servant of the People (political party) politicians